Henning Stockfleth (c.1610 – 5 February 1664) was a Norwegian cleric and Bishop of Oslo.

Biography
Henning Eggertsen Stockfleth was born in Haderslev, Denmark. He was the son of Danish merchant Eggert Stockfleth (1565-1638). In 1629, he entered the Latin school in Haderslev. He studied at the University of Rostock, continued in 1632 to the University of Wittenberg and came in 1635 to the University of Copenhagen. He took magister degree in theology in 1637.

Between 1628–1629, his parents and brothers had moved from Haderslev to Bragernes. From 1637, Stockfleth served as rector and professor at the Christiania Cathedral School. He later assumed various positions as priest. In 1641 he became vicar at Aker in Akershus,  priest at Akershus Fortress and later provost at Bragernes deanery. From 1646 to 1664, he was Bishop of Akershus stift (now Diocese of Oslo).

He was a signatory of the 1661 Sovereignty Act (Enevoldsarveregjeringsakten), the new constitution of Denmark-Norway, as one of the 87 representatives of the Norwegian clerical estate, one of the two privileged estates of the realm in Denmark-Norway.

Personal life
He was married to Magdalena Johansdatter Schnell (d.1674) and was the father of civil servant and diplomat Christian Stockfleth. His brother was  civil servant and businessman  Hans Stockfleth.

References

Other sources
Allan Tønnesen (ed.), Magtens besegling. Enevoldsarveregeringsakterne af 1661 og 1662 underskrevet og beseglet af stænderne i Danmark, Norge, Island og Færøerne, Heraldisk Selskap/Syddansk Universitetsforlag, Odense 2013,  

1610 births
1664 deaths
University of Copenhagen alumni
University of Wittenberg alumni
University of Rostock alumni
Norwegian people of Danish descent
Bishops of Oslo
Signatories of the Sovereignty Act
17th-century Lutheran bishops
Heads of schools in Norway
People from Haderslev Municipality